The Secu is a right tributary of the river Neamț in Romania. It flows into the Neamț in Leghin.

References

Rivers of Romania
Rivers of Neamț County